HNLMS Thetis (A887) was a accommodation ship of the Royal Netherlands Navy. It was used as a diving and disassembly school.

Construction 
Thetis was built at the Koninklijke Maatschappij De Schelde (KMS) between 1984 and 1985. The Dutch government awarded KMS the order to build the ship because the company had at the time overcapacity and therefore needed orders to prevent layoffs.

Service history 
In 1990 Thetis was used to provide further training to 25 doctors from 13 different countries. These doctors learned during the course how to provide help underwater. At the same time the Royal Netherlands Navy also offered to train divers of the Dutch fire departments how to handle during underwater accidents.

Notes

Citations

References

Barracks ships of the Royal Netherlands Navy
Barracks ships